The East Tennessee State University Arboretum is an arboretum located across the East Tennessee State University campus, Johnson City, Tennessee.

The arboretum was formally established in 2002, and currently includes nearly 200 labeled tree species.

See also 
 List of botanical gardens in the United States

References 
 East Tennessee State University Arboretum Map and Species List (brochure), ETSU Arboretum, Dept. of Biological Sciences, Box 70703, Johnson City TN 37614

External links 
 East Tennessee State University Arboretum

Arboreta in Tennessee
Botanical gardens in Tennessee
East Tennessee State University
Johnson City, Tennessee
Protected areas of Washington County, Tennessee